George Tobin is an American record producer.

George Tobin may also refer to:
 George Tobin (American football) (1921–1999), American football player
 George Tobin (Royal Navy officer) (1768–1838), British naval officer and artist
 George T. Tobin (1864–1956), American illustrator

See also
 Tobin (surname)